Kwame Leval Tucker (born 28 September 1976) is a Bermudian former cricketer, who played with the Bermudian cricket team in their first One Day International in May 2006. He played as a right-handed batsman and a wicket-keeper in 12 ODIs.

External links
 

1976 births
Living people
Bermudian cricketers
Bermuda One Day International cricketers
Wicket-keepers